War camp, warcamp, or, variation, may refer to:

 military camp, a camp for a military force in preparation for war
 training camp for military recruit training, a camp to train people to become warriors
 prisoner-of-war camp, a camp for containing combatants taken prisoner in battle 
 Warcamp, Lagos, Nigeria; see Architecture of Lagos
 War Camp, Iju, Ogun, Nigeria
 War Camp Community Services (WCCS), former name of The National Recreation Foundation

See also

 War (disambiguation)
 Camp (disambiguation)
 Quilombo (disambiguation)
 Eko (disambiguation)
 Battle camp (disambiguation)
 boot camp (disambiguation)
 Combat Camp (disambiguation)